Pericyma is a genus of moths in the family Erebidae. The genus was erected by Gottlieb August Wilhelm Herrich-Schäffer in 1851.

Species
Pericyma albidens (Walker, 1865) southern India
Pericyma albidentaria (Freyer, 1842) Greece, Saudi Arabia, Iran, Kasakhstan, from (Asia Minor, Middle East) - Afghanistan, Turkestan
Pericyma andrefana (Viette, 1988) Madagascar
Pericyma atrifusa (Hampson, 1902) Burkina Faso, Togo, Nigeria, Arabia, Sudan, Somalia, Kenya, Tanzania, Mozambique, Botswana, Zambia, Zimbabwe, Eswatini, South Africa, Namibia
Pericyma basalis (Saalmüller, 1891) Madagascar, Reunion
Pericyma caffraria (Möschler, 1884) South Africa
Pericyma cruegeri (Butler, 1886) Hong Kong, Taiwan, Vietnam, Thailand, Sumatra, Peninsular Malaysia, Borneo, Philippines, New Guinea, Queensland
Pericyma deducta (Walker, [1858]) South Africa
Pericyma detersa (Walker, 1865) northern India, Pakistan
Pericyma glaucinans (Guenée, 1852) Saudi Arabia, India (Silhet, Punjab), Myanmar, Thailand, Vietnam, Malaysia, Taiwan, Java, Philippines
Pericyma griveaudi (Laporte, 1973)
Pericyma madagascana Hacker, 2016 Madagascar
Pericyma mauritanica Hacker & Hausmann, 2010 Mauritania, Ivory Coast, Burkina Faso
Pericyma mendax (Walker, [1858]) Mauritania, Senegal, Gambia, Ghana, Burkina Faso, Nigeria, Congo, Zaire, Botswana, Saudi Arabia, Sudan, Somalia, Eritrea, Ethiopia, Uganda, Kenya, Malawi, Tanzania, Zambia, Zimbabwe, Mozambique, Eswatini, South Africa, Namibia, Madagascar, Mauritius
Pericyma metaleuca Hampson, 1913 Arabia, Ethiopia, Somalia, Kenya, Tanzania
Pericyma minyas (Fawcett, 1916) Ethiopia, Somalia, Kenya, Tanzania
Pericyma polygramma Hampson, 1913
Pericyma pratti (Kenrick, 1917) Madagascar
Pericyma scandulata (Felder & Rogenhofer, 1874)
Pericyma schreieri Hacker, 2016 Ethiopia, Somalia, Kenya, Tanzania
Pericyma signata Brandt, 1939 Saudi Arabia, Iran, Afghanistan, Nepal
Pericyma squalens Lederer, 1855 Turkey, Arabia, Libya, Egypt, Iran, Iraq, Jordan, Palestine, Tajikistan
Pericyma subbasalis Hacker, 2016 Taiwan
Pericyma subtusplaga Berio, 1984 Kenya
Pericyma umbrina (Guenée, 1852) India, Kenya, Somalia, Nambia, South Africa
Pericyma viettei (Berio, 1955) Madagascar
Pericyma vinsonii (Guenée, 1862) Madagascar, Mauritius, Reunion

References

Pericymini
Noctuoidea genera